Mitt sköna sextiotal is a Christer Sjögren studio album, released in Sweden on 17 September 2008 and on 24 April 2009 in Germany.

While being a tribute album to 1960s popular music, it also consists of the 2008 Christer Sjögren song "I Love Europe" and a recording of "If Tomorrow Never Comes", a 1989 Garth Brooks song.

Track listing
Everybody Loves Somebody
If Tomorrow Never Comes
Save the Last Dance for Me (duet with Jessica Andersson)
I Love You Because
That's Life
Young Girl
Early Mornin' Rain
Crazy
What Do You Want to Make Those Eyes at Me For
Ramlin' Rose
Green Green Grass of Home
Help Me Make It Through the Night
Only You
What a Wonderful World
I Love Europe (bonus track)

Contributors
Christer Sjögren - song
Lasse Wellander - guitar
Hasse Rosén - guitar
Thobias Gabrielsson - bass
Bosse Persson - bass
Peter Ljung - keyboard
Per Lindvall - drums
Lasse Persson - drums
Pablo Cepeda - percussion
Janne Lindgren - steelguitar
Wojtek Goral - saxophone
Lennart Sjöholm - producer, accordion

Charts

References 

2008 albums
Christer Sjögren albums